Pangaltı Roman Catholic Cemetery, also known as Feriköy Latin Catholic Cemetery, is a historic Christian cemetery in Istanbul, Turkey. It is the largest Catholic cemetery in Istanbul. The main Protestant burial ground of the city; Feriköy Protestant Cemetery, Istanbul lies just across the Catholic cemetery. Two neighboring cemeteries are divided by a road; Abide-i Hürriyet avenue.

History and description
The origins of the cemetery date back to 1853, when the Ottoman government declared that the graveyard of the Franks at Pera was no longer suitable as a burial ground. A new site was granted near the Imperial War Academy in Pangaltı as a cemetery for Istanbul's Protestant and Catholic communities. This initiative aimed at clearing ground for urban development in the Taksim area. Four years later, the allotted space was deemed insufficient for the dead of both communities, and a second grant – issued by order of Sultan Abdülmecid I in 1857.

Between 1840 and 1910, the area of Istanbul stretching northward from Taksim to Şişli was transformed from open countryside to densely inhabited residential settlement. Early 19th century maps of Istanbul show much of the area in this direction taken up by the non-Muslim burial grounds of the Grand Champs des Morts, with the Frankish section directly in the path of the main route of expansion, including the widening of the main road running from Taksim to Pangaltı. Due to this reason, the human remains were exhumed from the old Frankish burial ground in the Grand Champs des Morts and they were transferred, along with their grave markers, to its current location in 1863–1864 in Feriköy – created by order of Sultan Abdülmecid I in the 1850s – for re-interment.

The burial ground is separated by six squares and alleys with names of saints, extending from east to west. The ornate mausoleums of the great Levantine families are located in the west (Corpi, Botter, Tubini, Glavany). Several monuments have been erected in honour of the French and Italian soldiers died during the Crimean War (1853–1856).

The ossuary is made from reclaimed gravestones in old cemeteries of the Petits-Champs and Grand Champs at Pera in the 1850s.

The cemetery is used by various Catholic communities. The tombstones of the Levantines are the most numerous, but there are also monuments of Greek Catholics, Armenian Catholics, Syrian, Chaldean and Melkite communities.

Gallery

See also
 Pangaltı
 Feriköy Protestant Cemetery, Istanbul
 Pangaltı Armenian Cemetery

References

External links

 Postcard view of the Latin Catholic cemetery of Feriköy
 80 pictures of the graveyard

Cemeteries in Istanbul
Italian Levantines
Şişli
Roman Catholic cemeteries
Catholic Church in Turkey
Catholicism in Turkey
Christianity in Istanbul